Mladějov is a municipality and village in Jičín District in the Hradec Králové Region of the Czech Republic. It has about 500 inhabitants.

Administrative parts
Villages of Bacov, Hubojedy, Kozlov, Loveč, Pařízek, Roveň and Střeleč are administrative parts of Mladějov.

References

Villages in Jičín District